Robert Matheson (November 25, 1944 – September 5, 1994) was an American football linebacker who played 13 seasons in the National Football League (NFL). He played in three Super Bowls for the Miami Dolphins, including their 1972 and 1973 championships.

A linebacker at Duke University, he was drafted in 1967 by the Cleveland Browns in the first round of the NFL Draft, was the first year of the common draft between the AFL and NFL.  He was then acquired by the Dolphins prior to the 1971 season, after Miami defensive coordinator Bill Arnsparger requested head coach Don Shula to do so.  Miami gave up their second round draft pick in 1972 in exchange.  Matheson went to Miami one year after the Dolphins acquired Paul Warfield from Cleveland.

Matheson was often used by the Dolphins as a fourth linebacker in passing situations. This defensive alignment was often referred to as the "53" defense, named for Matheson's No. 53 jersey. This is also referred to as a 3–4 defense, with three linemen and four linebackers.

After leaving the Dolphins in 1979, Matheson returned to Duke as an assistant coach. He later coached special teams and linebackers for five years with the Miami Dolphins. He then joined Duke alumni John Gutekunst as an assistant coach at the University of Minnesota. In 1993, he returned to Duke to work at its Comprehensive Cancer Center.

Matheson died on September 5, 1994 at Duke University Hospital from complications of Hodgkin's disease, which he had had for 13 years.

References

1944 births
1994 deaths
American football linebackers
Cleveland Browns players
Duke Blue Devils football coaches
Duke Blue Devils football players
Miami Dolphins coaches
Miami Dolphins players
Minnesota Golden Gophers football coaches
People from Boone, North Carolina
Coaches of American football from North Carolina
Players of American football from North Carolina
Deaths from Hodgkin lymphoma
Deaths from cancer in North Carolina